Gabul may refer to:
 Gabulan